Fibroblast growth factor receptor 2 (FGFR2) also known as CD332 (cluster of differentiation 332) is a protein that in humans is encoded by the FGFR2 gene residing on chromosome 10. FGFR2 is a receptor for fibroblast growth factor.

The protein encoded by this gene is a member of the fibroblast growth factor receptor family, where amino acid sequence is highly conserved between members and throughout evolution. FGFR family members differ from one another in their ligand affinities and tissue distribution. A full-length representative protein consists of an extracellular region, composed of three immunoglobulin domains, a single hydrophobic membrane-spanning segment and a cytoplasmic tyrosine kinase domain. The extracellular portion of the protein interacts with fibroblast growth factors, setting in motion a cascade of downstream signals, ultimately influencing mitogenesis and differentiation. This particular family member is a high-affinity receptor for acidic, basic and/or keratinocyte growth factor, depending on the isoform.

Function 

FGFR2 has important roles in embryonic development and tissue repair, especially bone and blood vessels. Like the other members of the fibroblast growth factor receptor family, these receptors signal by binding to their ligand and dimerisation (pairing of receptors), which causes the tyrosine kinase domains to initiate a cascade of intracellular signals. On a molecular level these signals mediate cell division, growth and differentiation.

Isoforms 

FGFR2 has two naturally occurring isoforms, FGFR2IIIb and FGFR2IIIc, created by splicing of the third immunoglobulin-like domain. FGFR2IIIb is predominantly found in ectoderm derived tissues and endothelial organ lining, i.e. skin and internal organs. FGFR2IIIc is found in mesenchyme, which includes craniofacial bone and for this reason the mutations of this gene and isoform are associated with craniosynostosis.

Interactions 

Fibroblast growth factor receptor 2 has been shown to interact with FGF1.

The spliced isoforms, however differ in binding:

 FGFR2IIIb binds to FGF-1, -3, -7, -10, -22
 FGFR2IIIc binds to FGF-1, -2, -4, -6, -8, -9, -17 and -18

These differences in binding are not surprising, since FGF ligand is known to bind to the second and third immunoglobulin domain of the receptor.

Clinical significance 

Mutations (changes) are associated with numerous medical conditions that include abnormal bone development (e.g. craniosynostosis syndromes) and cancer.

Craniosynostosis syndromes 

 Apert syndrome, the best-known type of acrocephalosyndactyly, characterized by abnormalities of the skull and face, such as a cleft palate, and of the hands and feet. 
 Antley-Bixler syndrome, characterized by trapezoidal, craniofacial and skeletal synostosis, plus camptodactyly), inherited as a recessive trait.
 Pfeiffer syndrome, another type of acrocephalosyndactyly, includes broad thumbs and large toes, inherited in autosomal dominant fashion.
 Crouzon syndrome, a craniofacial disorder with no hand or foot problems. and potential cleft palate, inherited as a dominant trait.
 Jackson–Weiss syndrome

Cancer 

 Breast cancer, a mutation or single nucleotide polymorphism (SNP) in intron 2 of the FGFR2 gene is associated with a higher breast cancer risk; however the risk is only mildly increased from about 10% lifetime breast cancer risk in the average woman in the industrialized world, to 12-14% risk in carriers of the SNP.

Missense mutations of FGFR2 have been found in endometrial cancer and melanoma.

As a drug target
AZD4547 is a tyrosine kinase inhibitor which targets FGFR1-3. It has demonstrated early evidence of efficacy in gastric cancer patients with high level FGFR2 amplification (Cancer Discovery 2016). FPA144 is a monoclonal antibody that binds to FGFR2b (a form of FGFR2) and preventing binding of certain FGFs. In 2014, a clinical trial began to treat gastric tumours that overexpress FGFR2b.
Another approach of FGFR2 targeting is use of allosteric inhibitors. Alofanib is a novel first-in-class allosteric small-molecular inhibitor of FGFR2. It binds to the extracellular domain of FGFR2 and has an inhibitory effect on FGF2-induced phosphorylation. Principal benefits of allosteric inhibitors are high selectivity and low toxicity [Tsimafeyeu et al. ESMO Asia 2016]. A phase Ib clinical study protocol has been selected for ECCO-AACR-EORTC-ESMO Workshop on Methods in Clinical Cancer Research, better known as the ‘Flims’ Workshop and clinical study of safety and preliminary efficacy of alofanib will be initiated at the beginning of 2017.

Mutations 

FGFR2 mutations are associated with craniosynostosis syndromes, which are skull malformations caused by premature fusion of cranial sutures and other disease features according to the mutation itself. Analysis of chromosomal anomalies in patients led to the identification and confirmation of FGFR2 as a cleft lip and/or palate locus. On a molecular level, mutations that affect FGFR2IIIc are associated with marked changes in osteoblast proliferation and differentiation. Alteration in FGFR2 signalling is thought to underlie the craniosynostosis syndromes. To date, there are two mechanisms of altered FGFR2 signalling. The first is associated with constitutive activation of FGFR, where the FGFR2 receptor is always signalling, regardless of the amount of FGF ligand. This mechanism is found in patients with Crouzon and Pfeiffer syndrome. The second, which is associated with Apert syndrome is a loss of specificity of the FGFR2 isoform, resulting in the receptor binding to FGFs that it does not normally bind.

See also 
 Cluster of differentiation

References

Further reading

External links 
 GeneReviews/NIH/NCBI/UW entry on FGFR-Related Craniosynostosis Syndromes
 
 
 

Clusters of differentiation
Tyrosine kinase receptors